Lahe may refer to:

Lahe, Burma, town in Naga Hills, Sagaing Division, Burma
Lahe, Lääne-Viru County, village in Haljala Parish, Lääne-Viru County, Estonia
Lahe, Põlva County, village in Põlva Parish, Põlva County, Estonia
Lahe, Tartu County, village in Peipsiääre Parish, Tartu County, Estonia
Lahe, Hannover, district in the North East of Hannover, Germany